often abbreviated simply as Marvelous is a Japanese joshi puroresu or women's professional wrestling promotion based in Chiba, Japan. It was founded by Chigusa Nagayo in 2014.

History
According to Chigusa Nagayo, former chairman of All Japan Women's Pro-Wrestling Takashi Matsunaga, who died on July 11, 2009, entrusted his will to her, saying "I want to do it again at Yokohama Arena" in 2012. This referred to his significantly appreciation towards Nagayo's in-ring performance. Just before Matsunaga's death, his father, who died in the spring of 2018, said, "Please show me your professional wrestling skills one more time". Kaoru, who was an ex-ally of Nagayo during their time in Gaea Japan, returned after about three years of fighting illness, and together they put the base of the newfounded promotion of Marvelous That's Women Pro Wrestling. The promotion held its first official event on March 22, 2014, a house show hosted at Ota City General Gymnasium.

Over the years, the promotion has established partnerships with various promotions from the Japanese independent scene. On October 1, 2021, Marvelous held a cross-over event with Pro Wrestling Wave, promotion with which seldomly collaborates, the Marvelous/WAVE Fusion ~ Tommy 40th Anniversary. Marvelous started a professional relationship with World Wonder Ring Stardom at the beginning of 2022, sending various wrestlers from the roster to compete in rookie-based pay-per-views promoted by the latter promotion under the brand of "New Blood". Marvelous was first represented by Ai Houzan and Maria at Stardom New Blood 1 on March 11, 2022.

Since it's birth, the promotion never established their own created championships. But at GAEAism Decade Of Quarter Century, an independent event promoted on June 13, 2021, to commemorate sixteen years since the dissolution of Gaea Japan, it was announced that the latter promotion's AAAW Single Championship and AAAW Tag Team Championship would be revived and sanctioned by Marvelous beginning with 2022.

Roster

This is a list of professional wrestlers who currently wrestle for the company. Alumni and notable guest superstars are also included.

Active

Alumni/guests

Asuka
Ayame Sasamura
Chihiro Hashimoto
Dash Chisako
Dump Matsumoto
Hibiki
Hiroe Nagahama
Makoto
Mei Hoshizuki
Megumi Yabushita
Mikoto Shindo
Saki
Saki Akai
Yuki Miyazaki
Yuna Manase
Yuu

Championships

See also
Professional wrestling in Japan
List of professional wrestling promotions in Japan

References

External links

Twitter Marvelous

2014 establishments in Japan
Entertainment companies established in 2014
Japanese women's professional wrestling promotions